Uhrwiller is a commune in the Bas-Rhin department in Grand Est in north-eastern France. The archaeologist Ernest Will (1913–1997) was born in Uhrwiller.

Population

The demography of Uhrwiller has been quite stable for some years.

See also
 Communes of the Bas-Rhin department

References

Communes of Bas-Rhin
Bas-Rhin communes articles needing translation from French Wikipedia